The Round House is a historic house located at 971 West Main Street in the Centerville village of Barnstable, Massachusetts.

Description and history 
The three story wood frame round house was built in 1930 by William Boyne, and is the only known round house in Barnstable. The building has two full stories, which are topped by a flat roof and an enlarged cupola section with truncated conical roof. A circular brick chimney rises through the center of the house.

The house was listed on the National Register of Historic Places on March 13, 1987.

See also
National Register of Historic Places listings in Barnstable County, Massachusetts

References

Houses in Barnstable, Massachusetts
National Register of Historic Places in Barnstable, Massachusetts
Houses on the National Register of Historic Places in Barnstable County, Massachusetts
Houses completed in 1930